is an airport in Rishirifuji, Hokkaidō, Japan, near the town of Rishiri on Rishiri Island.

Airlines and destinations

References

Airports in Hokkaido